Haploperla is a genus of green stoneflies in the family Chloroperlidae. There are about 17 described species in Haploperla.

Species
These 17 species belong to the genus Haploperla:

 Haploperla brevis (Banks, 1895) (least sallfly)
 Haploperla chilnualna (Ricker, 1952)
 Haploperla choui Li & Yao, 2013
 Haploperla chukcho (Surdick & Stark, 1980)
 Haploperla datongensis Chen & Du, 2016
 Haploperla fleeki Kondratieff, Kirchner & Lenat, 2005
 Haploperla japonica Kohno, 1946
 Haploperla lepnevae Zhiltzova & Zwick, 1971
 Haploperla longicauda Zwick, 1977
 Haploperla maritima Zhiltzova & Levanidova, 1978
 Haploperla orpha (Frison, 1937)
 Haploperla parkeri Kirchner & Kondratieff, 2005
 Haploperla triangulata Chen & Du, 2016
 Haploperla tuanjiena Du & Chen, 2016
 Haploperla ussurica Navás, 1934
 Haploperla valentinae Stark & Sivec, 2009
 Haploperla zwicki Stark & Sivec, 2008

References

Further reading

 
 

Chloroperlidae
Articles created by Qbugbot